Graciela Palau de Nemes (March 24, 1919 – September 28, 2019) was a Cuban literary critic. She critiqued Spanish and Latin American literature with a specific focus on the works of the Nobel laureate poet Juan Ramón Jiménez.

Education 
Nemes attended the University of Maryland, College Park in 1946 where she met Juan Ramón Jiménez. Jiménez became Nemes' mentor while she undertook language teaching and pursued her master's and doctoral degrees. Nemes earned her master's degree in 1949 and her doctoral degree in 1952.

Career

Teaching 
Nemes began teaching at the University of Maryland in 1953 and remained until her retirement in 1989 as Professor Emerita in the Foreign Languages Department. She continued her role as an educator after retirement, teaching classes and giving lectures at the University of Maryland until 2011.

Literary criticism 
Nemes nominated Jiménez for the Nobel Prize in Literature, which he won in 1956. She became the major critic of Jiménez's works and was recognized as such by subsequent generations who benefited from her early work. The  in Spain counted her as an honorary member.

On the 50th anniversary of Jimenéz's Nobel Prize, Nemes was invited to speak at eight conferences dedicated to Jiménez and Zenobia Camprubí. She delivered opening and closing plenary lectures throughout Spain, including Madrid, Huelva, Seville, and Moguer. She was one of the participants in the seminar that took place at the Residencia de Estudiantes in Madrid and was interviewed by the media. She was also invited to a conference and panel presentation centered on Jiménez in New York that took place at the CUNY Graduate Center in New York City; she traveled to Madrid and Moguer once more for the closing events of the three-year-long celebrations (2006, 2007, 2008) planned in honor of Jiménez.

Accolades 
In 2004, a street in Moguer, Jiménez's birthplace, was named in her honor. 

Nemes was honored in 2006 with the Great Cross of Alfonso X El Sabio from the Civil Order of Alfonso X, the Wise. Nemes also received the Medalla de Mérito Civil (Medal for Civil Merit) from the Spanish government.

List of works 

 Vida y obra de Juan Ramón Jiménez (1957)
 Inicios de Zenobia y Juan Ramón Jiménez en América (1982)

References

External links
Works by Graciela Palau de Nemes Universidad de Rioja, Spain

1919 births
2019 deaths
Recipients of the Civil Order of Alfonso X, the Wise
Cuban literary critics
Women centenarians
Cuban centenarians
University of Maryland, College Park faculty
Women literary critics
People from the Province of Huelva
University of Maryland, College Park alumni
Cuban expatriates in the United States